Andrii Rybachok (born 11 November 1994) is a Ukrainian sprint canoeist. He is 2021 World Champion and multiple medalist. He also won several medals at the European Championships.

References

External links

1994 births
Ukrainian male canoeists
Living people
ICF Canoe Sprint World Championships medalists in Canadian
People from Kovel
Canoeists at the 2019 European Games
European Games medalists in canoeing
European Games silver medalists for Ukraine
Sportspeople from Volyn Oblast
21st-century Ukrainian people